Hatem is a masculine Arabic given name, it may refer to:

Given name
 Hatem Ali, Syrian actor 
 Hatem Ben Arfa, French football player of Tunisian descent
 Hatem Aqel, Jordanian footballer 
 Hatem Ali Jamadar, Bengali politician
 Hatem Trabelsi, Tunisian footballer
 Hatem El Mekki, Tunisian painter.

Surname
 Abdulaziz Hatem, Qatari footballer
 Jad Hatem, Lebanese poet
 Shafick George Hatem (Ma Haide), Lebanese-American doctor
 Thomas J. Hatem (1925–1985), American politician

Arabic-language surnames
Arabic masculine given names